Parliamentary elections were held in Colombia on 27 October 1991 to elect the Senate and Chamber of Representatives. The result was a victory for the Liberal Party, which won 87 of the 161 seats in the Chamber and 56 of the 102 seats in the Senate.

Background
Following a spate of political violence, an unofficial referendum on forming a Constitutional Assembly was held alongside the March 1990 parliamentary elections. An official referendum was later held in May, which saw 96% of voters vote in favour of convening an Assembly.

Elections for the Assembly were held in December 1990, and a new constitution was promulgated in July 1991.

The Constitutional Assembly passed the Acto Constituyente de Vigencia Immediata on 18 June 1991, which called for fresh Congressional elections in October, with the newly elected Congress replacing the one elected under the previous constitution in 1990.

Campaign
A total of 486 lists were registered for the election, of which 237 were affiliated with the Liberal Party and 64 with the Conservative Party.

Results

Senate

Chamber of Representatives

References

Parliamentary elections in Colombia
Colombia
1991 in Colombia
Election and referendum articles with incomplete results